Jo Schot (22 January 1894 – 19 July 1923) was a Dutch footballer. He played in one match for the Netherlands national football team in 1922.

References

External links
 

1894 births
1923 deaths
Dutch footballers
Netherlands international footballers
Place of birth missing
Association footballers not categorized by position